Sergio Morin (September 16, 1931 in Monfalcone – October 12, 2010) was an Italian professional footballer.

Honours
 Serie A champion: 1952/53.

References

1931 births
2010 deaths
Italian footballers
Serie A players
Serie B players
Inter Milan players
F.C. Pavia players
S.P.A.L. players
S.S.C. Napoli players
Hellas Verona F.C. players
Association football midfielders
Vigevano Calcio players